The Religion Act 1592 (35 Eliz. I, c. 1) was an Act of the Parliament of England. The Act imprisoned without bail those over the age of sixteen who failed to attend Church; persuaded others to do the same; denied Queen Elizabeth I's authority in religious matters; and who attended unlawful religious meetings. The Act was cognisable in the Court of High Commission.  If, after offending, they did not conform in the next three months, they would be exiled from England forever. The Act fined those who harboured recusants £10 for every month hidden. The Act stated that it would continue no longer than the end of the next session of Parliament. However, the Act was still in effect in 1661, when John Bunyan was tried and convicted for disobedience to it.

Towards the end of 1680, during the Exclusion Crisis, Parliament passed a Bill for repealing the Act. However, on the day of the proroguing of Parliament (10 January 1681), when the Bill ought to have been presented to Charles II to sign, he instructed the Clerk of the Crown to withdraw the Bill.

As late as 1683 the act was being used against a Quaker meeting in 'Gratious' Street (Gracechurch Street), London.

Notes

Acts of the Parliament of England concerning religion
1592 in law
1592 in England
1592 in Christianity